Phil Harding is a journalist, broadcaster and media consultant. Previously he was a producer, editor and senior executive at the BBC.

Career
At the BBC, Harding held a wide variety of senior editorial jobs. He was Director of English Networks and News for the World Service, Controller of Editorial Policy (responsible for the editorial standards of all BBC output and writing the BBC's editorial guidelines), and Editor of the Today programme on Radio 4, during which time the programme won five Sony Gold awards.  He also headed the project which led to the founding of Radio Five Live and became the networks' first Editor of News Programmes. He was also Chief Political Adviser for the BBC and deputy editor of Panorama.

He now broadcasts for the BBC, both as a contributor and as a presenter, and works as an international media consultant. Recently he has worked with broadcasters in Egypt, Taiwan, Tanzania, the Maldives, Argentina, and the United States, on topics such as ‘public broadcasting in the digital age’, ‘fair reporting of politics’, ‘journalism in the public interest’, and ‘dealing with politicians and political pressure’.

Academic contributions 
Harding leads courses at the BBC's College of Journalism on editorial leadership.
 
He is the author of a report for Oxfam on international coverage and the future of U.K. public broadcasting – The Great Global Switch Off. He also writes for the Guardiannewspaper.

Accolades
Harding has won numerous Sony Gold awards for radio and an Emmy for television in the United States.

He is a Trustee of the Press Association and of the One World Broadcasting Trust. He is a Fellow of the Society of Editors and of the Radio Academy.

References

Radio editors
Living people
Year of birth missing (living people)
British radio executives